Domenico Merola was an Italian composer.

Recordings

Sacred Salterio - Lamentations of the Holy Week Miriam Feuersinger (soprano) and Franziska Fleischanderl (salterio & direction) Il Dolce Conforto

References

18th-century Italian composers
Year of birth missing
Year of death missing